is a Japanese track cyclist, born in Kikuchi.

Career
From 2009 to 2018, she won an unprecedented 10 consecutive gold medals in professional sprint cycling events at the Japanese National Track Race Championships.

At the 2012 Summer Olympics, she competed in the Women's sprint. She also competed in the sprint event at the 2012, 2013, 2014 and 2015 UCI Track Cycling World Championships.

On 9 September 2018, Maeda announced her retirement from cycling.

Career results

2013
ACC Track Asia Cup – Thailand Round
1st Sprint
1st 500m Time Trial
2014
Track Clubs ACC Cup
1st Keirin
1st Sprint
1st 500m Time Trial
2nd Sprint, Japan Track Cup 2
3rd  Team Sprint, Asian Track Championships (with Takako Ishii)
3rd Sprint, Japan Track Cup 2
2015
Track Clubs ACC Cup
1st 500m Time Trial
2nd Sprint
3rd Keirin
Asian Track Championships
2nd  Team Sprint (with Takako Ishii)
3rd  500m Time Trial
2016
Taiwan Hsin-Chu Track International Classic
1st Sprint
3rd Keirin
3rd Team Sprint (with Takako Ishii)
3rd Keirin, Japan Track Cup
3rd  Team Sprint, Asian Track Championships (with Takako Ishii)
2017
Japanese National Track Championships
1st  Sprint
2nd  Keirin
Asian Track Championships
3rd  Keirin 
3rd  Team Sprint (with Riyu Ohta)

References

Japanese female cyclists
Living people
Olympic cyclists of Japan
Cyclists at the 2012 Summer Olympics
Japanese track cyclists
1991 births
Cyclists at the 2010 Asian Games
Cyclists at the 2014 Asian Games
Cyclists at the 2018 Asian Games
Asian Games competitors for Japan

People from Kumamoto Prefecture
20th-century Japanese women
21st-century Japanese women